Benedict Lloyd-Hughes (born 14 April 1988) is a British actor. He is known for portraying Josh Stock in the British series Skins (2007) and for his role as Will in the film Divergent (2014). He plays Tsar Alexander in the 2016 BBC television series War & Peace, and Greg in the 2020 series Industry. Lloyd-Hughes joined the main cast of period drama Sanditon (based on Jane Austen's unfinished novel), as Alexander Colbourne for its second series which aired in 2022. Personal life 
Lloyd-Hughes was born in 1988 in London, the son of Lucy Appleby and Timothy Lloyd-Hughes. He has an older brother, actor Henry Lloyd-Hughes, and a sister, football journalist Flo Lloyd-Hughes. Both brothers acted in Miliband of Brothers, a satirical docu-drama centered around the 2010 Labour leadership election. He attended St. Paul's School, London. In 2011 he finished his acting training at the Guildhall School of Music and Drama in London. Fred Macpherson, lead singer of the band Spector, and formerly of Les Incompétents and Ox.Eagle.Lion.Man, is his cousin.

Filmography

 Film 

 Television 

 Video games 

 Theatre 
 2012: The Way of the World''

References

External links 
 
 Interview with Ben Lloyd-Hughes

1988 births
21st-century British male actors
Living people
Male actors from London
Alumni of the Guildhall School of Music and Drama